Gabriela Sabadošová (born 29 October 1958) is a Slovak handball player. She competed in the women's tournament at the 1988 Summer Olympics.

References

1958 births
Living people
Slovak female handball players
Olympic handball players of Czechoslovakia
Handball players at the 1988 Summer Olympics
People from Nitra District
Sportspeople from the Nitra Region